The Purdue Grand Prix is a go-kart race that has been held annually on Purdue University's West Lafayette, Indiana campus since 1958. A primary function of the event is to raise money for scholarships for Purdue students under the aegis of the Purdue Grand Prix Foundation and its motto, "Students Helping Students."

Student organizations, including residence halls, co-op houses, and Greek organizations, build and race go-karts on a purpose-built race course located on the Purdue University campus. The event is open to all members of the student body, including students at regional campuses. Students at the Indianapolis campus (IUPUI) have won the race on several occasions, possibly due in part to the motorsports engineering major offered on that branch campus.

Qualifications are held, weather permitting, on a single day a week before race day. The karts are divided into groups of four and are allowed 7 minutes on the track.  Each kart's fastest lap is recorded as its qualifying time.  The top 27 times are placed in the starting field from fastest to slowest. The remaining six positions are determined by 25-lap sprint races held prior to the main Grand Prix race. The top two finishers from each sprint race comprise the rest of the 33-kart starting grid.

Every five years alumni races are held where former students who participated in the Grand Prix return to race. Karts built prior to 1986 take part in a 15-lap Classic race. Newer karts race in the 35-lap Modern race.

The main feature is then held following the pre-race festivities.

The 2007 Grand Prix was the 50th anniversary celebration. Dr. David Wolf, a Purdue graduate and astronaut, was the Grand Marshal for that year's race.

The 2008 Grand Prix was the final race held on the track located north of Ross-Ade Stadium, modeled after the World Grand Prix Championship Track in Japan. This track was removed due to the Mackey Arena expansion project. Built in 1968, it was completed in time for the 11th running of Grand Prix. The new track, which has been used since the 2009 event, is located at the corner of McCormick Road and Cherry Lane, near the Northwest Sports Complex.

In 2010 the first Electric Vehicle Grand Prix was held at the Purdue Grand Prix track, following a similar format to its gasoline-powered counterpart.  There is an annual race in Indianapolis in the infield of the Indianapolis Motor Speedway in addition to some years where a race is held at the Purdue Grand Prix track on the West Lafayette campus.  Purdue teams and teams from visiting universities are often allowed to test at Purdue's track on the days in which the gas karts are not practicing.  While the EV Grand Prix does not attract as many karts as the Purdue Grand Prix, it has a much more widespread reach, attracting teams from three continents and across the United States.

Social event

Though the race is held on a Saturday, associated festivities begin the weekend before resulting an entire week of parties and other events, both sanctioned and unsanctioned. A newer tradition which precedes the race itself is the Breakfast Club.  Early on the morning of the race, local bars re-open to hordes of costume-clad students and alumni.  Screwdrivers and other alcoholic drinks are served to patrons dressed in a variety of costumes, the more outrageous or inventive the better.

Grand Prix is also a large event for alumni who often return to campus for the weekend.

New track

After more than 40 years of racing on its original track, due to the Mackey renovation, in 2008 construction began on a new race track, which was completed in time for the 52nd Annual Grand Prix. It cost roughly $1 million to build.

Winners

History
Ian Smith and Jimmy Simpson are the only drivers to win the Grand Prix in three consecutive years. Smith, Simpson, and Timothy O'Brien are the only drivers to win the race three times.  Simpson is the only driver to win the race 4 times.  
Five members of the Smith family have combined to win eight Grand Prix races.
Liz Lehmann is the first female driver to ever win the Grand Prix. The 2007 race, held on April 21, was her third try. She finished 4th in 2006; in 2007 she was in the top 5 the entire race. She finished third in 2008.
Several IUPUI students have participated in the Purdue Grand Prix.  Their first entrant was John Steger in 1976.
Phi Sigma Rho is the first sorority to participate in the Purdue Grand Prix, starting in the 1990s. Multiple Phi Rho drivers have qualified for the race.

References

External links
Purdue Grand Prix Foundation
"Purdue's 51st Grand Prix race to be last on four-decade-old track" Purdue News Service

Purdue University
Kart racing events
West Lafayette, Indiana
Recurring sporting events established in 1958
1958 establishments in Indiana
College sports in Indiana